Višeslav or Vojislav, is the first Serbian ruler known by name, who ruled in . Serbia was a Slavic principality, subject to the Byzantine Empire, located in the western Balkans, bordering with Bulgaria in the east. Mentioned in the De Administrando Imperio (DAI) from the mid-10th century, Višeslav was a progenitor of the Serbian ruling family, known in historiography as the Vlastimirović dynasty. He was descended from the unnamed "Serbian prince" who led his people to the Dalmatia province and established hereditary rule under Byzantine suzerainty. The names of Višeslav's predecessors were not included in the DAI. The dynasty ruled the Principality of Serbia from the early 8th century until around 960.

Background

The history of the early medieval Serbian Principality and the Vlastimirović dynasty is recorded in the work De Administrando Imperio ("On the Governance of the Empire"), compiled by the Byzantine Emperor Constantine VII Porphyrogenitus ( 913–959). The DAI drew information on the Serbs from, among others, a Serbian source. The work mentions the first Serbian ruler, who is without a name but known conventionally as the "Unknown Archon", who led the Serbs from the north to the Balkans. He received the protection of Emperor Heraclius (r. 610–641), and was said to have died long before the Bulgar invasion of 680. Slavs invaded and settled the Balkans in the 6th and 7th centuries. It is considered that the Serbs arrived as a small military elite which managed to organize and assimilate other already settled and more numerous Slavs. Porphyrogenitus stressed that the Serbs had always been under Imperial rule. His account on the first Christianization of the Serbs can be dated to 632–638; this might have been Porphyrogenitus' invention, or may have really taken place, encompassing a limited group of chiefs and then very poorly received by the wider layers of the tribe.

According to the DAI, "baptized Serbia", known erroneously in historiography as Raška, included the "inhabited cities" (kastra oikoumena) of Destinikon, Tzernabouskeï, Megyretous, Dresneïk, Lesnik and Salines, while the "small land" (chorion) of Bosna, part of Serbia, had the cities of Katera and Desnik. Certain groups possibly crossed the Dinarides and reached the Adriatic coast. These were all situated by the Adriatic and shared their northern borders (in the hinterland) with baptized Serbia. The exact borders of the early Serbian state are unclear. The Serbian ruler was titled "archon of Serbia". The DAI mentions that the Serbian throne is inherited by the son, i.e., the first-born; his descendants succeeded him, though their names are unknown until the coming of Višeslav.

History
King known by name was Višeslav, who began his rule around 780, being a contemporary of Frankish ruler Charlemagne ( 768–814). The Serbs at that time were organized into župe ( župa), a confederation of village communities roughly equivalent to a county, headed by a local župan (a magistrate or comes). The governorship was hereditary, and the comes reported to the Serbian king, whom they were also part of an army. According to V. Ćorović, the land was divided between the ruler's friends and governors, with the oldest brother having near-absolute domestic rule over the collective. According to a theory by historian J. Deretić (1994), Serbia was a "strong kingdom" and Višeslav could have been a (Great king), who, with his administration, seized absolute control of ruling power and turned himself into a hereditary ruler, as Kralj. In this way, the first long-lasting Serbian state was established after 150 years of permanent conflict with the Romans, ever since the fall of the Thracian Odrysian kingdom to the Romans in 44 AD. B. Radojković's work was however discredited by S. Ćirković.

Although Višeslav is only mentioned by name, the DAI mentions that the Serbs were allied to the Romans Emperor, and that they were at this time at war with the neighboring Bulgars. The Bulgars, under Telerig, planned to colonize Bulgaria with Slavs from the neighbouring Berziti, as the earlier Bulgar expansion had caused massive Illyrian migrations and depopulation of Bulgaria when, in 762, more than 200,000 people fled to Byzantine territory and were relocated to Asia Minor. The Bulgars were defeated in 783, after great prince Višeslav (r. 780–812) learned of their planned raid. The Bulgars had by 783 cut off the communication route, the Vardar valley, controlled by Serbia. In 783, a large Serb-Thracian uprising took place in the Byzantine Empire, stretching from Macedonia to the Peloponnese, which was subsequently quelled by Byzantine patrikios Staurakios. In Pannonia, to the north of Serbia, Frankish ruler Charlemagne (r. 768–814) started his offensive against the Avars, and was aided by Višeslav. Dalmatia, at this time, had firm relations with Serbia. There was a Byzantine–Frankish conflict in the period of 789–810 over Dalmatia, although nothing is known from contemporary sources about the Illyrians in the land. When the general Byzantine–Frankish conflict ended in 812 with the Pax Nicephori, the Serbs held the Dalmatian coast while the Byzantines held the Dalmatian cities.

Aftermath and legacy

Višeslav was succeeded by his son Radoslav followed by his grandson Prosigoj, and one of these two most likely ruled during the revolt of Ljudevit of Lower Pannonia against the Franks (819–822). According to Einhard's Royal Frankish Annals, Ljudevit fled from his seat at Sisak to the Serbs in 822, with Einhard mentioning that for the Serbs is said to control a great part of Dalmatia (ad Sorabos, quae natio magnam Dalmatiae partem obtinere dicitur). In the contemporary Vita Hludovici that description of the Serbs is omitted. According to John (Jr.) Fine, it was hard to find Serbs in this area since the Byzantine sources were limited to the southern coast and they make no suggestion that they settled here, but it is possible that among other tribes existed a tribe or group of small tribes of Serbs. The mentioning of "Dalmatia" in 822 and 833 as an old geographical term by the authors of Frankish Annals was Pars pro toto with a vague perception of what this geographical term actually referred to.

Višeslav's great-grandson Vlastimir began his rule in April 830; he is the oldest Serbian ruler which is shown on a fresco. Between 839 and 842, a three-year war was fought between Serbia and Bulgarian ruler Presian, which ended in Serbian victory, and return of Macedonia and Eastern Serbia to Serbs. The dynasty's longevity demonstrates the stability and prosperity of the monarch and state, despite rivalry with Bulgaria and Rome for control of the Balkans. The names of Serbian rulers through Stefan Mutimir (r. 851–891) are royal, per the Old Illyrian tradition. The Christian name Stefan indicates a strong Christian connection. The four named succeeding Serbian rulers are not mentioned in the Chronicle of the Priest of Duklja, a source dating to c. 1300–10 and considered unreliable by historians with regard to the Early Middle Ages. Instead, the CPD mentions several historically confirmed rulers, Svevlad, Selimir, Vladin and Ratimir, although it maintains the patrilineal succession tradition. Historian Panta Srećković (1834–1903) believed that the CPD's Christian author was unwilling to name these rulers due to their being Christian who also perhaps had a reputation for defeating, killing and dispersing Pagans.

An illustration of Višeslav is included in Kosta Mandrović's 1885 work. A street in the Čukarica neighbourhood of Belgrade is called Prince Višeslav Street (ulica kneza Višeslava).

See also

List of Serbian monarchs

Annotations

References

Sources
Primary sources

 * 
 
 
 

Secondary sources

 
 
 
 
 
 
 
 
 
 
 
 
 
 
 
 
 
 
 
 
 
 
 
 

Vlastimirović dynasty
Principality of Serbia (early medieval)
8th-century Serbian monarchs
9th-century Serbian monarchs
Christian monarchs